Groeswen Halt railway station served the hamlet of Groeswen in Caerphilly, South Wales.

History and description
Opened as 'Groeswen', the station was similar in construction to the other halts on the line. It had ground-level platforms which were without shelters, and had only wooden fenced enclosures, the gates of which would be unlocked by the train guard. Despite scrimping on passenger facilities, the Company provided Groeswen with a signal box and a large manager's house for the tramway (industrial) which led from Groeswen Colliery to a siding which ran through the 'down' platform. This was installed in 1899 to connect with the already-existing colliery sidings. In 1907, a down refuge siding was added, and lasted until 1949, though the crossover remained until 1952.

Closure and after
Like the other stations on the branch, Groeswen closed in 1956. In the same year, the Groeswen signal box was demolished. The remains of the trackbed were cleared in 1988. The site of the halt is now a picnic area, though the stone retaining wall of the signal box remains.

References

Railway stations opened in 1904
Railway stations closed in 1956
Former Great Western Railway stations